Kevin McAlinden (17 November 1913 – 3 April 1978) was a footballer from Northern Ireland who represented Great Britain at the 1948 Summer Olympics. McAlinden played amateur football as a goalkeeper with Belfast Celtic.

References

1913 births
1978 deaths
Association footballers from Northern Ireland
Footballers at the 1948 Summer Olympics
Olympic footballers of Great Britain
Belfast Celtic F.C. players
League of Ireland XI players
Cork United F.C. (1940–1948) players
Association football goalkeepers